Charles Bennett "Buck" Llewellyn (29 September 1876 – 7 June 1964) was the first non-white South African Test cricketer. He appeared in 15 Test matches for South Africa between 1895 and 1912, and played in English cricket as a professional for Hampshire between 1899 and 1910.

Life and career
Born out of wedlock in Pietermaritzburg to a Welsh father and a black Saint Helenan mother, the dark-eyed and dark-skinned Llewellyn had an underprivileged upbringing in Natal, being considered of mixed blood. He showed all round cricketing prowess from a young age as a hard hitting left-handed batsman, slow left-arm bowler (with a dangerous slow left-arm wrist-spin delivery as part of his arsenal) and a great fielder, particularly at mid-off.

While the racism of late nineteenth-century South Africa had led to other leading non-white players being omitted from representative sides, Llewellyn's ability to pass himself off as white in some cases (Wilfred Rhodes described him as "like a rather sunburned English player"), helped clear the racial hurdle to selection and he was chosen to make his first-class debut for Natal against Transvaal on 13 April 1895, where he took four wickets. While now accepted as a cricketer, Llewellyn would be referred to as "coloured" throughout his career and there are reports of his race-related mistreatment by other South African players.

Duly impressed with his cricketing skill, selectors chose him in a Natal side against Lord Hawke's England XI and subsequently selected Llewellyn to make his Test debut for South Africa against England at Johannesburg on 2 March 1896, aged 19 years and 155 days.

Llewellyn failed to take a wicket in this first Test and was promptly omitted from the remainder of the series but responded by performing impressively in the 1897–98 and 1898–99 Currie Cups, which led to his recall to the national team for the first Test of the 1898–99 series against England. Llewellyn impressed by taking five wickets but was surprisingly left out of the second Test.

At the end of the 1898–99 series Llewellyn, perturbed by the actions of the selectors and seeking financial security, left South Africa to play for English county side Hampshire County Cricket Club as a professional, on the recommendation of South African teammate Major Robert Poore, an ex-Hampshire cricketer on military assignment. He would star for Hampshire for over a decade, scoring 8772 runs at 27.58 and snaring 711 wickets at 24.66. His form was such that in 1902 Llewellyn was named in the English First Test squad against the touring Australians, missing out on the final side. He was however included in a strong English side captained by Ranjitsinhji to tour America that included Jessop, Sammy Woods, Archie MacLaren, Stoddart, Bosanquet and Townsend.

In 1902–03 Llewellyn returned to South Africa to play in the three Test series against Australia. He scored 90 in the First Test, his highest Test score, as well as taking nine wickets for the match. Llewellyn took ten wickets in the second Test and six in the third to top the series bowling average at 17.92; a remarkable achievement considering Australia won the series 2–0.

Llewellyn continued to shine for Hampshire, capped by his selection as one of Wisden's Five Cricketers of the Year in 1910, his last year at Hampshire. He then toured Australia with the South African team, where his bowling served as fodder for Victor Trumper, before returning to England in 1911 to join club side Accrington, thereby becoming the first Test cricketer to play in the Lancashire League.

In 1912, South Africa brought him out of first-class retirement to play in the Triangular Tournament, scoring 75 in the first Test against England at Lord's and a further half-century against Australia at Lord's.

Llewellyn retired from Test cricket after the triangular tournament, having played 15 Tests (five against England and ten against Australia), scored 544 runs at 20.14 and 48 wickets at 29.60. He however continued to star in league cricket, finally retiring in 1938 at the age of 62.

Llewellyn broke his thigh in 1960, affecting his movement for the remainder of his life and died in Chertsey, Surrey in 1964, aged 87. Even after his death, Llewellyn remained a controversial figure, as Llewellyn's daughter, resident in England, in 1976 publicly contested claims that he was not white, stating that his mother had been an English-born white woman.

Llewellyn's legacy as the first non-white South African Test cricketer remains large. During the apartheid period he was used to show that non-white cricketers could perform as well as their white counterparts, while modern day commentators have pointed to the erratic selection of Llewellyn for South Africa throughout his career as the result of prejudice due to his skin colour.

While Llewellyn was the first non-white South African Test cricketer, it was not until Omar Henry took the field against India in November 1992 that South Africa had its second.

References 

 Merret, C. (2004) "Sport and Race in Colonial Natal: C.B. Llewellyn, South Africa’s First Black Test Cricketer", The Cricket Statistician, Association of Cricket Statisticians and Historians, Winter 2004, No. 128, Nottingham.

External links
 

1876 births
1964 deaths
KwaZulu-Natal cricketers
Hampshire cricketers
London County cricketers
South Africa Test cricketers
South African people of Welsh descent
South African people of Saint Helenian descent
Wisden Cricketers of the Year
Players cricketers
Marylebone Cricket Club cricketers
Coloured South African people
Players of the South cricketers
North v South cricketers